Bassetlaw  is a parliamentary constituency in Nottinghamshire, represented in the House of Commons of the UK Parliament since the 2019 general election by Brendan Clarke-Smith, a Conservative. Before that election, the seat had been part of the so-called "red wall", being held by the Labour Party since 1929.

Constituency profile
The Bassetlaw constituency is mostly rural and covers the north of Nottinghamshire, including the towns of Worksop and Retford. It shares the name with the Bassetlaw district. Parts of the constituency are former coal mining areas.

Residents' health and wealth are slightly below the UK average.

Boundaries

The constituency includes 22 electoral wards from Bassetlaw District Council:
Beckingham, Blyth, Carlton, Clayworth, East Retford East, East Retford North, East Retford South, East Retford West, Everton, Harworth, Langold, Misterton, Ranskill, Sturton, Sutton, Welbeck, Worksop East, Worksop North, Worksop North East, Worksop North West, Worksop South, Worksop South East.

Latest boundary changes
Following their review of parliamentary boundaries in Nottinghamshire, the Boundary Commission for England made changes to the constituency for the 2010 general election to allow for population changes, most noticeably by moving the small town of Market Warsop into Mansfield constituency.

History
The constituency was created in 1885 by the Redistribution of Seats Act.

History of boundaries

The Bassetlaw Division (named after one of the ancient Wapentakes of the county) as originally created in 1885 consisted of the municipal borough of East Retford, the petty sessional divisions of Retford and Worksop and part of Mansfield petty sessional division.

In 1918, the number of parliamentary divisions in Nottinghamshire was increased from four to five, with resulting changes in boundaries. Bassetlaw Division was now defined as containing the Municipal Borough of East Retford, the Urban Districts of Warsop and Worksop, and the Rural Districts of Blyth & Cuckney, Misterton and East Retford, with the civil parish of Sookholme from Skegby Rural District.

In 1950, the five Parliamentary Divisions of Nottinghamshire were reorganised as six County Constituencies. Local government boundary changes in the 1930s now meant that Bassetlaw County Constituency was defined as comprising the Municipal Boroughs of East Retford and Worksop, the Urban District of Warsop and the Rural Districts of East Retford and Worksop.

The constituency's boundaries then remained unchanged until 1983. In that year, the town of East Retford and the neighbouring areas were transferred to the redrawn Newark constituency. Bassetlaw constituency then comprised Worksop and surrounding areas in the Bassetlaw district as well as the town of Warsop in the Mansfield district (see list of wards during this period below). There were no boundary changes in 1997.

From 1983 to 2010, the constituency comprised the following Bassetlaw district wards:
Beckingham, Blyth, Carlton, Clayworth, Everton, Harworth East, Harworth West, Hodsock, Misterton, Rampton, Ranskill, Sturton, Sutton, Welbeck, Worksop East, Worksop North, Worksop North East, Worksop North West, Worksop South, Worksop South East
along with two Mansfield district wards:
Birklands, Meden (both in the Warsop area). These wards were transferred to Mansfield constituency in 2010.

Bassetlaw constituency boundaries, shown within the county of Nottinghamshire

Electoral history

On a historical measure, this had been a very safe seat for the Labour Party before 2019, with their own or related candidates having held it since the 1929 general election. On a size-of-majority measure, it was a low to medium safe seat. Its first Member of Parliament Malcolm MacDonald was one of the few Labour MPs to join his father Ramsay MacDonald's National Government. MacDonald held the seat as a National Labour candidate in the 1931 election, but was defeated at the next election in 1935 by Labour's Frederick Bellenger.

Bellenger held the seat until he died in 1968. A by-election followed. The seat was retained for the Labour Party by Joe Ashton with a slender 1.72% majority, the narrowest since the 1920s. He held the seat until retirement at the 2001 general election. He was succeeded at that year's election by fellow Labour politician John Mann, who retained the seat at the next four elections. In 2019, Mann resigned being having been appointed to head a government inquiry on tackling anti-Semitism and to take a seat in the House of Lords. The Labour candidate initially chosen to replace Mann, Sally Gimson, was deselected before the election by the party's National Executive Committee over what were described as "very serious allegations". Gimson referred to the process as a "kangaroo court", and Mann called the decision a stitch-up; Gimson started legal action against the party, but dropped the case several days later. Keir Morrison, a councillor in the Ashfield District, replaced Gimson as the Labour candidate.

In the December 2019 general election, the Conservatives won the seat with a swing from Labour of 18.4%, the largest recorded in the election. The fall in Labour's vote, 24.9%, was the greatest of any seat in the election.

Members of Parliament

Elections

Elections in the 2010s

Elections in the 2000s

Elections in the 1990s

Elections in the 1980s

Elections in the 1970s

Elections in the 1960s

Elections in the 1950s

Election in the 1940s

Election in the 1930s

Elections in the 1920s

Elections in the 1910s

General Election 1914–15:

Another General Election was required to take place before the end of 1915. The political parties had been making preparations for an election to take place and by July 1914, the following candidates had been selected; 
Unionist: Ellis Hume-Williams
Liberal:

Elections in the 1900s

Elections in the 1890s

Elections in the 1880s

See also
List of parliamentary constituencies in Nottinghamshire

Notes

References

Sources
UK General Election 1945 results
UK General Election 1950 results
UK General Election 1951 results
UK General Election 1955 results
UK General Election 1959 results
UK General Election 1964 results
UK General Election 1966 results
UK General Election 1970 results
UK General Election February 1974 results
UK General Election October 1974 results
UK General Election 1979 results
UK General Election 1983 results
UK General Election 1987 results
UK General Election 1992 results
UK General Election 1997 results
UK General Election 2001 results
UK General Election 2005 results
UK General Election 2010 results (BBC)

Parliamentary constituencies in Nottinghamshire
Constituencies of the Parliament of the United Kingdom established in 1885